The 1978 NCAA Division II Soccer Championship was the sixth annual tournament held by the NCAA to determine the top men's Division II college soccer program in the United States.

In a rematch of the previous year's final, Seattle Pacific defeated defending champions Alabama A&M in the final, 1–0 (after two overtime periods), to win their first national title and their first after losing their previous three appearances in Division II championship matches (1974, 1975, 1977).

The final was played at Florida International University in Miami, Florida on December 2, 1978.

Bracket

Final

See also  
 1978 NCAA Division I Soccer Tournament
 1978 NCAA Division III Soccer Championship
 1978 NAIA Soccer Championship

References 

NCAA Division II Men's Soccer Championship
NCAA Division II Men's Soccer Championship
NCAA Division II Men's Soccer Championship
NCAA Division II Men's Soccer Championship
Soccer in Florida